The University of Texas Permian Basin (UTPB) is a public university in Odessa, Texas. It is part of the University of Texas System.  UTPB was authorized by the Texas Legislature in 1969 and founded in 1973. UTPB is now home to over 7,000 students and 250 teaching faculty.

History 

The University of Texas of the Permian Basin began in 1973 as a university that initially offered only junior, senior, and graduate level programs. Among those who pushed for the establishment of UTPB was the oil industrialist Bill Noël, who with his wife, Ellen Witwer Noël, became major philanthropists of the institution. A rivalry with Odessa College (OC) got underway from the very beginning, when OC students taunted the UTPB students that they were too old to produce a streaker. A student finally agreed, and with only his head covered, streaked across the campus.

In 1991 the university began accepting freshmen and sophomore applicants, and in 2000, the J. Conrad Dunagen Library and Lecture Center was completed, featuring a twenty-station multimedia lab and classroom.  

During 2006, the university was holding discussions with the Nuclear Regulatory Commission about the construction of a new High-Temperature Teaching and Test Reactor which, if successful, would finish licensing and construction around 2012. It would also be the first university-based research reactor to be built in the US in roughly a decade, and one of the few HTGR type reactors in the world. In late November in 2016 the city of Odessa granted site permission. That was the first step in official authorization.

On April 17, 2008, the university broke ground on a new Science and Technology Complex. The new building houses chemistry, biology, physics, computer science, and information technology programs. The new  building contains 41 labs, 56 offices, six classrooms, and three sunken lecture halls.  Despite warnings from a UTPB Geology professor, the contractor failed to identify an underground aquifer that could cause the building supports to sink. Construction was delayed while the contractor reinforced the building supports after drilling into the aquifer; however, the building opened in time for the Fall 2011 semester. The building houses classrooms, multiple laboratories including two large demonstration labs, a 200-seat lecture hall, and a state-of-the-art Data Communications Teaching Lab for undergraduate and graduate students. The Computer Science Department maintains a computer science research lab and a computer networking research lab.

A state-of-the-art building known as the Wagner Noël Performing Arts Center is now open in the Midland campus, off Hwy 191 and FM 1788. Construction began in 2009 and the center opened with a grand gala featuring Rod Stewart on November 1, 2011.

In 2018, UTPB announced a new Kinesiology building at a cost of around 37 million dollars. The following year, UTPB announced the opening of its 55 million dollar Engineering building.

Campus

Main campus

A Stonehenge replica was added adjacent to the Visual Arts Studio.

Parker Ranch House
Mesa Building
J. Conrad Dunagan Library/Lecture Center
Founder's Building
Visual Arts Studio
Gymnasium Complex
Gym Annex Building
Falcon's Nest(Housing)
Falcon's Court(Housing)
Industrial Technology Building
Science and Technology Building
Student Activity Center
Thermal Energy Plant
Physical Plant
PETS

 Other places of interest
Ellen Noël Art Museum
Presidential Archives and Leadership Library
Fire Station (City of Odessa)
U.T.P.B. Park (City of Odessa)

Midland campus
Center for Energy and Economic Diversification (CEED)
Wagner Noel Performing Arts Center
Performance Hall
Rea-Greathouse Recital Hall

Future developments
Engineering Building
Student Housing
Academic Additions

Academics
The university offers bachelor's degrees and master's degrees, through its five colleges and schools:
 College of Arts and Sciences
 College of Business
 College of Engineering
 College of Education
 College of Nursing

Athletics

The Texas–Permian Basin (UTPB) athletic teams are called the Falcons. The university is a member at the Division II level of the National Collegiate Athletic Association (NCAA), primarily competing as a member of the Lone Star Conference (LSC) since the 2016–17 academic year. The Falcons previously competed in the D-II Heartland Conference from 2006–07 to 2015–16; in the Red River Athletic Conference (RRAC) of the National Association of Intercollegiate Athletics (NAIA) from 1998–99 to 2005–06; and as an NAIA Independent from 1995–96 to 1997–98. The teams' uniforms reflect the school colors of orange, white, and black.

UTPB competes in 16 intercollegiate varsity sports: Men's sports include baseball, basketball, cross country, football, golf, soccer, swimming & diving and tennis; while women's sports include basketball, cross country, golf, soccer, softball, swimming & diving, tennis and volleyball.

References

External links

 
 Official athletics website

 
Buildings and structures in Ector County, Texas
Education in Ector County, Texas
Universities and colleges accredited by the Southern Association of Colleges and Schools
Public universities and colleges in Texas
Permian Basin
Tourist attractions in Ector County, Texas
Educational institutions established in 1973
1973 establishments in Texas